Richard Avina Renteria (born December 25, 1961) is a Mexican-American former professional baseball infielder and former manager of the Chicago Cubs and Chicago White Sox of Major League Baseball (MLB).  Renteria played in parts of five seasons between 1986 and 1994 with the Pittsburgh Pirates, Seattle Mariners, and Florida Marlins.  He then coached and managed in the Marlins organization until 2001, and in the San Diego Padres organization until 2013. He was the manager of the Chicago Cubs in 2014. Renteria was also the bench coach for the Chicago White Sox in 2016.

Playing career
After playing for South Gate High School in South Gate, California, Renteria was drafted by the Pittsburgh Pirates with the 20th overall pick in the 1980 Major League Baseball draft. He made his Major League debut for the Pirates on September 14, 1986. That December he was traded to the Seattle Mariners, and played for them for the 1987 and 1988 seasons. Renteria spent 1989 playing for the Mariners Minor League Baseball affiliate the Calgary Cannons, and the 1990 and 1991 seasons with the Mexican League's Jalisco Charros.

For 1993 and 1994, he returned to the majors, playing for the Florida Marlins. While with the Marlins, he was nicknamed "The Secret Weapon" for his versatility on the field and his timely pinch hitting. In his five Major League seasons, he played in 184 games and had 422 at bats and a .237 batting average.

Coaching career
After his playing career, Renteria has remained in baseball. He continued to manage in the Marlins system until . In , he was named the hitting coach for the Lake Elsinore Storm in the Padres organization, and in  he became the Storm's manager. After three seasons with the Storm, in  he was moved up to the Triple-A Portland Beavers.

Renteria moved to being the Padres bench coach for 2011. He also managed the Mexico national baseball team in the 2013 World Baseball Classic. On November 7, 2013, Renteria was hired as the manager of the Chicago Cubs. After one season on the job, he was terminated on October 31, 2014, one week after his Cubs successor Joe Maddon opted out of his contract with the Tampa Bay Rays.

For the 2016 season, Renteria was hired by the Chicago White Sox to serve as their bench coach.

For the 2017 season, Renteria replaced White Sox manager Robin Ventura. Renteria was the second manager in Chicago baseball history, after Johnny Evers, to manage both the city's franchises. In 2017 he was ejected seven times, more than any other manager in the major leagues. In 2020, he took the White Sox to the playoffs for the first time since 2008. They lost in the Wild Card Series in 3 games to the Oakland Athletics. On October 12, the White Sox announced that Renteria would not return as manager, ending his tenure with the team with one year remaining on his contract. His overall record in four seasons with the Sox was 236-309.

Managerial record

References

External links

1961 births
Living people
Alexandria Dukes players
American baseball players of Mexican descent
American expatriate baseball players in Canada
American expatriate baseball players in Mexico
Baseball coaches from California
Baseball players from California
Calgary Cannons players
Charros de Jalisco players
Chicago Cubs managers
Chicago White Sox coaches
Chicago White Sox managers
Diablos Rojos del México players
Edmonton Trappers players
Florida Marlins players
Greenwood Pirates players
Gulf Coast Marlins players
Gulf Coast Pirates players
Hawaii Islanders players
Indianapolis Indians players
Lynn Pirates (1983) players
Major League Baseball bench coaches
Major League Baseball infielders
Nashua Pirates players
People from Harbor City, Los Angeles
Pittsburgh Pirates players
Portland Beavers managers
Portland Sea Dogs managers
Seattle Mariners players
World Baseball Classic managers